The 1971 Kansas City Chiefs season was the franchise's second season in the National Football League (NFL), ninth as the Kansas City Chiefs, and twelfth overall. They improved from a 7–5–2 campaign in 1970 to record a 10–3–1 mark and win the AFC West division championship, the Chiefs' first division title since 1966 and last until 1993. The Chiefs tied with the Miami Dolphins for the best record in the AFC and were tied for the third-best record overall in the NFL, trailing only the 11–3 marks of the Dallas Cowboys and Minnesota Vikings.

The Chiefs' playoff loss to Miami remains the longest game in NFL history at 82 minutes and forty seconds. Dolphins kicker Garo Yepremian made a 37-yard field goal with seven minutes and twenty seconds left in the second overtime to win the game.

Season summary 
Most of the pieces of the team which won Super Bowl IV two years earlier were still in place. Left defensive end Jerry Mays retired after the 1970 season, with Marvin Upshaw taking his spot, but the other ten defensive starters were the same as they were two years prior. Middle linebacker Willie Lanier was a unanimous All-Pro selection following the season, and would likely have been named NFL Defensive Player of the Year had not Viking defensive tackle Alan Page become the second defensive player to win the league's Most Valuable Player award. Outside linebacker Bobby Bell, defensive tackles Buck Buchanan and Curley Culp, and cornerback Emmitt Thomas joined Lanier on the AFC Pro Bowl squad following the season. Bell, Buchanan, Culp, Lanier, and Thomas are all members of the Pro Football Hall of Fame.

On offense, Robert Holmes was traded to the San Diego Chargers midway through the season, leaving Wendell Hayes to assume the fullback duties next to third-year pro Ed Podolak, who had become the starting halfback when Mike Garrett was traded to San Diego in 1970. Rudnay assumed the starting center spot in 1970 over veteran E. J. Holub. At wide receiver, rookie Elmo Wright, the Chiefs' first-round pick in the 1971 NFL Draft from the University of Houston, assumed the slot opposite all-pro Otis Taylor, as Frank Pitts had moved on to the Cleveland Browns. Taylor earned selection to the Pro Bowl, along with guard Ed Budde, quarterback Len Dawson, and tackle Jim Tyrer.

Kansas City's special teams remained among the league's elite units, thanks to the combination of kicker Jan Stenerud and punter Jerrel Wilson, both of whom were named to the Pro Bowl. Podolak and Warren McVea handled the bulk of the return duties.

The season was the last for the Chiefs in Municipal Stadium; owner Lamar Hunt and general manager Jack Steadman were overseeing the construction of Arrowhead Stadium, located at the junction of Interstates 70 and 435 in Jackson County, at the eastern edge of the Kansas City city limits. Arrowhead, along with Royals Stadium, being constructed for the Kansas City Royals of Major League Baseball, comprised the Truman Sports Complex, bucking the trend of multi-purpose stadiums in vogue at the time.

The season ended as the Miami Dolphins won the longest game in National Football League history on Christmas Day, defeating the Chiefs 27–24 in double-overtime on a 37-yard field goal by Garo Yepremian in the last football game in Municipal Stadium, as well as the last game for safety Johnny Robinson, who was an original member of the franchise as a rookie on the 1960 Dallas Texans. Head coach Hank Stram often called the 1971 Chiefs the franchise's best-ever squad, and the home playoff loss haunted Stram for the rest of his life, even after his induction into the Pro Football Hall of Fame in 2003; Stram died in 2005 at age 82. Others in the Hall of Fame from this squad are owner Hunt, quarterback Dawson, and kicker Stenerud.

The loss to Miami began a nosedive in the Chiefs' fortunes. Kansas City backslid to 8–6 and 7–5–2 in 1972 and 1973, before falling to 5–9 and a tie for last in the AFC West in 1974, leading to Stram's firing following the season. Kansas City did not reach the playoffs again until 1986, did not host (or win) another playoff game until 1991, and did not win the AFC West division title again until 1993.

NFL Draft

Roster

Schedule

Preseason

Regular season

Postseason

Standings

References

External links 
 1971 Kansas City Chiefs on Database Football

Kansas City Chiefs seasons
Kansas City Chiefs
AFC West championship seasons
Kansas